Branko Đurić (born 28 May 1962), also known by his nickname Đuro (Cyrillic: Ђуро), is a Bosnian actor, comedian, film director and musician, who lives and works in Ljubljana, Slovenia.

Born and raised in Sarajevo, Đurić rose to prominence throughout Yugoslavia with the hit comedy series Top lista nadrealista during the 1980s. Đuro became something of an epitome for the Bosnian people, primarily due to his accent and slang. He was also one of the founding members of SCH and the frontman of the award-winning Sarajevo rock band Bombaj Štampa. In August 1992, several months into the Bosnian War, he moved to Slovenia where he has been residing ever since.

He has starred in the Academy Award-winning film No Man's Land and has had supporting roles in numerous high-profile films, including The Smell of Quinces, Time of the Gypsies, Kuduz, Bal-Can-Can, In the Land of Blood and Honey and See You in Montevideo. He has also created the comedy series Naša mala klinika, which has spawned an entire franchise with Slovenian, Croatian and Serbian counterparts.

Early life
Born to a Serb father from Kruševac and Bosniak mother Fadila, his twenty-one-year-old father died of cancer when infant Branko was only one. From an early age the youngster exhibited a propensity for public performance.

When Đurić was fourteen, his widowed mother married painter Branislav "Branko" Popovac so part of the youngster's adolescence was spent with a stepfather who encouraged him to pursue his artistic talents.

In 1981, he applied at the Academy of Performing Arts (ASU), a newly established faculty within the University of Sarajevo, but got rejected. Following the ASU rejection, he instead enrolled in journalism studies at the University of Sarajevo's Faculty of Philosophy.

Career
Đurić didn't give up on acting after the ASU rejection, getting work as an extra in various TV Sarajevo productions. He also continued applying at the ASU ahead of each new academic year, and after two more rejections in 1982 and 1983, finally got accepted on his fourth try in 1984. Once accepted at the ASU, he quit the journalism studies where he had completed two years.

Early acting roles
In April 1984, while contemplating giving the ASU another try, Đurić joined Top lista nadrealista, a new prime-time television show being launched by TV Sarajevo as an overlap between folk music and sketch comedy. Made by a group of Sarajevo youths from the New Primitivism sub-cultural milieu Đurić already knew well and was on friendly terms with, the sketches were framed as comedy fillers in-between folk music performances by top local folk music stars. Being a bit of a new piece in this group of sketch performers, young Đurić right away proved a good fit with fellow youngsters who had prior been cutting their teeth via putting out a 15-minute weekly radio segment airing as part of the Saturday morning Primus program on Radio Sarajevo's channel two before now getting the chance to showcase their talents in front of a large television audience.

In parallel with Top lista nadrealista being shot, Zabranjeno Pušenje, one of the bands from the same New Primitives scene released its debut album and Đurić played a small role in the TV Sarajevo produced video for their "Neću da budem Švabo u dotiranom filmu" track. At the said video shoot directed by the aspiring film director Ademir Kenović, Đurić told Kenović of his continual woes getting accepted at ASU to which Kenović responded by sending over his friend Vuk Janić to help Đurić prepare and hone material for the upcoming audition. Đurić finally got accepted.

In early June 1984, Top lista nadrealista television episodes started airing on TV Sarajevo's second channel. Early reaction was largely one of indifference, but after a few episodes, the sketches started catching on. By now known to the wider public by his nickname Đuro, Đurić was a prominent member of the troupe, playing multiple characters, though the one that got him most attention was his portrayal of a jumpy TV station security guard with a catchphrase "Ćega, ba". TV show's popularity as well as its folk music context led to lucrative offers to all members of the group from local folk music promoters and managers, such as Rizo Rondić, of doing sketch comedy at their clients' live shows and tours through Bosnian towns and villages. Đuro and colleague Zenit Đozić took many of those offers throughout the second part of 1984, cashing in their Nadrealisti prominence by performing as comic relief on folk music tours named "Udri kapom o ledinu", "Zasviraj i za pojas zadjeni", "Prođoh Bosnu pjevajući", etc.

From late 1984 and into 1985, Đuro participated in Audicija, a no frills stage comedic production that began as academic project consisting of Academy of Stage Arts (ASU) students creating, developing, and performing characters based on various individuals applying to the academy. Conceptualized as a series of one-on-one auditions between each applicant and a professor, with students drawing upon their own auditioning experiences, the production gained prominence after one of its stage shows got filmed and broadcast on TV Sarajevo's Noćni program. Performing alongside fellow academy students Željko Ninčić, Admir Glamočak, Emir Hadžihafizbegović, Haris Burina, Saša Petrović, Jasmin Geljo, Željko Kecojević, and Senad Bašić, Đuro's streetwise Sarajevan, Solomon Bičakćić, proved to be among the more popular characters from the show. Though drawing mostly poor reviews from the critics, Audicija'''s folksy humour soon became a comedy smash hit all over Yugoslavia with Đurić performing in 150 stagings of the show across the country before quitting his participation and even somewhat distancing himself from the show. Subsequent ASU generations would also start performing the show and taking it on the road across the country.

However, they would soon gain further significance due to their jingle-like, Bregović-composed tune (featuring Đuro's vocal singing about the mountains) getting made into a full-length track called "Hajdemo u planine" ('Let's Go to the Mountains') on Bijelo Dugme's (Bregović's band) next studio album Pljuni i zapjevaj moja Jugoslavijo released in November 1986, this time sung by the band's vocalist Alen Islamović. With the song in heavy radio rotation and the album selling well, the commercials also began airing a lot more frequently, leading to a surge of popularity for Đurić throughout late 1986 and early 1987. Due to Bregović's habit of mercilessly reusing and recycling old material, the same tune would in 1992 also be sung by Iggy Pop as "Get the Money" on the Arizona Dream movie soundtrack.

The movie was shot throughout 1986 and aired in January 1987 on TV Sarajevo. Ovo malo duše led to a few more dramatic roles on television for Đurić – in Znak series on TVSa and Vanja movie that aired on TV Novi Sad.

He also continued doing TV commercials – this time for Dedo and Nana coffee – going back to his, by now well established, "good-natured, streetwise Sarajevo guy" persona.

Đuro then caught a bit of break when the Palm d'Or-winning director Emir Kusturica cast him in Dom za vešanje, which became the young actor's very first role in a feature film. The fact this was Kusturica's first feature after the director's Palme d'Or-winning previous effort ensured plenty of attention for the project along with a Cannes showing. Though his part in the movie was minor (he played one of the Gypsy thugs in Italy), Đuro left a good impression that opened many new doors for the young actor.

Popularity in Yugoslavia

By 1989, a sought-after actor all over Yugoslavia, Đuro played a memorable supporting role in Kuduz, Kenović's feature film debut. He also participated in Kako je propao rokenrol (a three-story ensemble film by recent Belgrade Faculty of Dramatic Arts graduates), playing the male lead in the third story opposite Vesna Trivalić about a young couple preparing for the arrival of their first baby.

In fall 1989, Top lista nadrealista's second series started airing, a 7-episode chunk that achieved huge viewership rates in addition to critical praise, all of which solidified Đuro's status in the country. Playing different funny characters every week like street policeman Rade Pendrek, cranky average TV viewer Reuf, high-strung TV news director Đuđi, do-it-yourself 'Đurine kućne čarolije' segment host, etc. led to another huge wave of popularity for the actor.

Bosnian War and relocation to Slovenia
At the outbreak of Bosnian War during spring 1992 Đuro was in Sarajevo before fleeing the city in late August 1992, several months into the siege, and settling in Ljubljana.

He also works in Croatia, where he had a TV show Pet Minuta Slave (Five Minutes of Fame) on Nova TV, as well as the comedy series Naša mala klinika (Our Little Clinic), which was being aired on POP TV and Nova TV.

In the mid-2000s, Ðurić starred in and directed TV series Brat bratu, the Slovenian version of Only Fools and Horses. The series got cancelled after thirteen episodes due to poor viewership.

In February 2007, Ðurić has appeared on B92 television in Serbia in Ðurine žute minute short segments, a slightly different take on his widely popular "Ðurine kućne čarolije" sketch, which he performed on Top lista nadrealista. The segments, which had a commercial tie-in with Telekom Srbija's Žute strane (Yellow Pages), mostly received poor reviews and were quickly taken off the air.

In 2011, he played a Serbian soldier in the movie In the Land of Blood and Honey.  This was Đurić's second movie about the Bosnian War. The first one was 2001 film No Man's Land. In it, Ðurić played Čiki, a Bosniak soldier.

Musical career

In parallel with trying to make it as an actor, and later after managing to become a successful one, Đuro was involved with bands though his musical engagement was mostly scheduled around his acting one.

He started with a band called Ševe in the early 1980s with childhood friend Nedim Babović. Đuro then joined punk outfit SCH in 1983, but soon transferred to Bombaj Štampa re-joining Nedim Babović. As Đurić's acting career took off, the band also became more prominent, although their activity was always sporadic. In 1987 their debut album got released.

In December 2008, he reunited with Bombaj Štampa for a concert in Sarajevo featuring original guitarist Nedim Babović and drummer Dragan Bajić along with bassist Ernie Mendillo (The Brandos). More concerts followed and an album of new material was released in the spring of 2010.

On 25 July 2019, Đurić and his band Bombaj Štampa gave two-hour performance on Zenica city square – as one of many concerts during Zenica summer fest 2019 (second main show of this festival). He performed, among other songs, his new song called Čekić – that will appear on the album that is due to be released in September 2019 –, as well as one opera.

Personal life
Đurić married Slovenian actress and singer Tanja Ribič. They have two daughters, Zala and Ela. From his first marriage, he has a son, Filip. He resides in Ljubljana, where he leads a production company Theatre 55.

Filmography

Film

Television

Stage

Voice-over dubs

Discography

With Bombaj Štampa
Bombaj Štampa (1987) 
Ja Mnogo Bolje Letim Sam (1990)
Neka DJ Odmah Dole CJ (2010)

Awards and nominations

See also
Rene Bitorajac
Danis Tanović

References

External links

Official site 

1962 births
Living people
Male actors from Sarajevo
Musicians from Sarajevo
Film people from Sarajevo
Bosnia and Herzegovina male actors
Yugoslav male actors
21st-century Bosnia and Herzegovina male actors
21st-century Bosnia and Herzegovina writers
Yugoslav writers
Bosnia and Herzegovina theatre directors
Bosnia and Herzegovina film directors
Bosnia and Herzegovina male film actors
Bosnia and Herzegovina male stage actors
Bosnia and Herzegovina male television actors
Bosnia and Herzegovina rock musicians
Croatian Theatre Award winners
Indexi Award winners
Bosnia and Herzegovina comedians
New Primitivism people
Top lista nadrealista
21st-century Bosnia and Herzegovina male singers
20th-century Bosnia and Herzegovina male singers
Bosnian expatriate actors